Robert Clifton Brackins III (born September 14, 1988) is an American rapper, record producer, and songwriter. Brackins was born in Berkeley, California, but was primarily raised in East Oakland, California. Brackins is perhaps best known as songwriter, having co-wrote Tinashe's single "2 On" and Chris Brown's hit "Loyal". Brackins is also known for his guest feature on Ray J's controversial hit single "I Hit It First" in 2013, which sold over 100,000 copies independently.

Aside from writing and producing for other artists, Brackins also has career as a recording artist. He initially signed with Republic Records as a solo artist in 2010, with the 2014 single "143", featuring Ray J, peaking at number 84 on the Billboard Hot 100 chart. His most recent releases include his extended play titled To Live For, which was released on May 13, 2016. The EP features singles such as "Hot Box", featuring rapper G-Eazy and Mila J, and "My Jam" which features Disney Channel star Zendaya and Jeremih. The EP also includes features from fellow California artists Marc E. Bassy, Ty Dolla $ign, Eric Bellinger, and Mina.

Early life
Robert Clifton Brackins III was born on September 14, 1988, in Berkeley, California. During Brackins' infancy, his parents relocated to East Oakland, California, where he was raised. His father Robert Clifton Brackins Sr. owned a music studio in the Bay Area. During an interview, Brackins discretely recalls being around artists such as Tony Tony Tony while with his father in the studio. Brackins did not, however, begin to take music seriously until his freshman year of high school when he connected with music producer Nic Nac through a mutual friend. The two began working on music together, after discovering Nic Nac's ability to produce instrumentals, and Brackins' ability to create and write lyrics and melodies. After Graduating high school, Brackins attended San Jose State University, but dropped out and moved to Los Angeles, California where he currently resides.

Career
Brackins musical career began after he formed a band with a group of local friends called "Go Dav". The group entered and won a radio contest, causing their single "Ride Or Die Chick" to gain radio plays. Shortly after the contest, the song skyrocketed to fame on the MySpace social media network. Eventually, the group split up due to certain complications, desires and issues. After high school, Brackins moved to Los Angeles, California to be closer to Nic Nac and to further pursue his musical career. He was then able to meet other producers, artists and songwriters including Ray J, Pia Mia, Trevcase, Redwine, Marc Griffin/Marc E Bassy, and YG. He then released 2 mixtapes. His first being titled "Pimp Hand Strong", which features artists such as Marc Griffin, Kendre and Tinashe. His second mixtape was called Maxwell Park and featured artists such as Ray J, Forest Lipton, Lil Debbie, Iamsu! and Kreayshawn. In 2010, Brackins Ty Dolla $ign and YG, went on a 10-day tour to promote their upcoming mixtape. The "Young and Hungover" mixtape was released in 2011 and was hosted by DJ Mustard and DJ Ilwill. Brackins' fame was primarily gained from his single "143" featuring Ray J. After releasing the single, Brackins got signed to Universal Records. After being signed, he released a single called "I'm Ready", which features Marc Griffin, and is a description of Brackins lifestyle after the release of "143". In March 2011, Brackins released a video for "A1" featuring DEV from his Live Good. 5 EP.

Eventually, Brackins was released from his contract with Universal. He then signed to an independent record label in the Bay Area called Tycoon Status Entertainment LLC. Brackins then proceeded to continue writing music for himself as well as other artists including Zendaya's first single "Swag It Out", Tinashe's song "Chainless", and Pia Mia's single F**k With You (FWU) featuring G-Eazy. He has also written mainstream singles which include, Chris Brown's "Loyal" and "Came To Do", Ty Dolla $ign's "Saved", and Tinashe's "2 On" and "Party Favors." After releasing singles "My Jam" featuring Zendaya and Jeremih, "Hot Box" featuring G-Eazy and Mila J, Faithful featuring Ty Dolla$ign as well as a remix featuring Iamsu!, and Indigo (which was originally supposed to feature Anderson Pac), Brackins released To Live For 1 of 3 EPs. His 2nd EP, called To Kill For is due to be released in early 2017 according to Brackins' Twitter. He has also stated that he has written for artists including Nicki Minaj, Christina Milian, and Gwen Stefani. Brackins has also had vocal features in songs including Marc E Bassy's "Drunk and I'm Drunk", K.Young's remix to his song "Please Me", and Mila J's track "Sorry". Other songs and features include Zendaya's "My Baby" off her debut self-titled studio album (which Brackins wrote before vocally featuring in the remix), Yellow Claw and DJ Mustard's track "In My Room" (which he wrote), and Pia Mia's SoundCloud release track "Underneath".

Aside from musical production, Brackins has also traveled on tour to open and perform for other artists. Brackins first joined Niykee Heaton while she was on The Centerfold Tour. He opened and performed with Heaton in cities including Portland, Oregon, Boise, Idaho, and Seattle, Washington. Brackins also joined Marc E Bassy for the West Coast dates of his Groovie People Tour, performing in cities such as Denver, Colorado,  Vancouver, British Columbia, Canada, and Salt Lake City, Utah.

Discography
Studio albums

Extended plays
Live Good .5 (2010)

Singles
 Hot Box ft. G-Eazy and Mila J
 My Jam featuring Zendaya and Jeremih
 143 featuring Ray J

References

External links
Bobby Brackins on Twitter

1988 births
Living people
African-American male rappers
American male rappers
21st-century American rappers
21st-century American male musicians
21st-century African-American musicians
20th-century African-American people